Kimalasõ (known as Kimalase before 1997) is a village in Rõuge Parish, Võru County in southeastern Estonia. Between 1991–2017 (until the administrative reform of Estonian municipalities) the village was located in Misso Parish.

References

External links 
Satellite map at Maplandia.com

Villages in Võru County